Martin Michael Solomon (born January 24, 1950) is an American lawyer and politician from New York.

Life
He was born to a Jewish family. He graduated with a B.A. magna cum laude from SUNY Albany and a J.D. from New York Law School in June 1975. He practiced law in Brooklyn, and entered politics as a Democrat.

In 1978, he was elected to the New York State Senate, to fill the vacancy caused by the appointment of Albert B. Lewis as State Superintendent of Insurance. Solomon was re-elected several times, and remained in the Senate until 1995, sitting in the 182nd, 183rd, 184th, 185th, 186th, 187th, 188th, 189th, 190th and 191st New York State Legislatures.

In November 1995, he was elected to the New York City Civil Court; and in November 2003 to the New York Supreme Court (2nd. D.). In May 2012, he was appointed to the Appellate Term for the 2nd, 11th and 13th districts.

References

1950 births
Living people
University at Albany, SUNY alumni
New York Law School alumni
Politicians from Brooklyn
Democratic Party New York (state) state senators
New York Supreme Court Justices